Aarne Lakomaa (1914–2001) was a Finnish aircraft designer. Born in Finland, Lakomaa graduated from Helsinki Polytechnics. He fought as an Army Lieutenant in the Winter War (1939–40) and the Continuation War (1941–44) against the Soviet Union. There he became famous for fitting captured Russian engines to the obsolete French fighter Morane-Saulnier M.S.406, thereby creating a first rate fighter, the Mörkö-Morane ("mörkö" being Finnish roughly for "bogeyman" or "hobgoblin"). Aarne Lakomaa first replaced the original Hispano-Suiza 12Y 31 liquid-cooled V-12 rated at 860 hp with a 1,100 hp Soviet engine— the Klimov M-105P—which was a war booty. This engine was installed under the cover of a more aerodynamic cowling and fitted with a different pitch propeller. The French M.S.406's airframe was strengthened, and an oil cooler from a Messerschmitt-109 replaced the old one. In this way over-heating problems was finally solved. As a result of these modifications, the improved version of Morane had a 36-mph speed advantage over all previous versions.

Lakomaa was recruited to Saab in 1944 as an aircraft designer. He was involved in the development of the fighters Saab 35 Draken and Saab 37 Viggen, and later headed R&D at Saab where he designed a number of prototypes, including a rocket propelled interceptor, nuclear weapon carriers, replacements for the Draken and Viggen, which was initially developed to substitute the Saab 32, and a supersonic business jet. Aarne Lakomaa was a part of team that first began studies on this theme in 1952–57. They were aimed at producing an aircraft with excellent short runway performance.

Aircraft designs

Civilian projects 
Saab 90 Scandia, airliner 1946
SuperSonic Executive (SSE), a sort of a large Viggen with twin J 93s for 4–6 passengers, 1968
Saab 108 Turboprop airliner
Saab 115/108-6: Three-engined jet commuter
Saab 107 (STOL/RTOL) field transport aircraft
Saab 108 MULAS, 1977:
Saab 109 Twin engined business jet
Saab 110 As 109 but three engines and up to nine passengers
Saab 111 Single engine agricultural turboprop
Saab 112 Twin jet corporate aircraft, 15 passengers, 1969
Saab 113 Three-engined corporate jet, 25 passengers, 1969
Saab 190 Super Scandia, twin ALF 502 commuter jet (over the wings for grass field capability), 1975
Saab 340

Military projects 
Saab 1319 missile-armed fighter with two de Havilland rocket engines
Saab 1325 was a Draken replacement fighter with Gyron jets with partial afterburners on the wingtips and an (automatically starting in case of engine failure) rocket in the tail (the rocket motor is still in use on sounding rockets)
Saab 1350 was a larger attack variant of 1325, with full afterburners
Saab 1352 single engine (Olympus) of 1350
Saab 1372 was an unstable double delta (did not proceed far, in fact, not even a wind tunnel model was produced)
Saab 1376 was the A 36 nuclear strike bomber
Saab 1377 like 1376 but with a dorsal air intake
Saab 1421B was a M 2.8 Draken replacement in 1956
Saab 1500-01, which was similar to a Harrier
Saab 1504 in 1961 looked very much like Viggen

References

1914 births
2001 deaths
Saab
20th-century Finnish engineers
Finnish expatriates in Sweden